Futuro Imperfetto is the sixth studio album by the Italian band Punkreas, released in 2008.

Track listing
 Non cambio mai - 3:01
 Ho bevuto la droga - 2:52
 Mondo moderno - 2:55
 Family gay - 2:53
 Dritto in faccia - 2:59
 Tyson rock - 3:08
 Ultima spiaggia - 3:27
 Cuore nero - 4:15
 La spesa - 3:11
 Life is now - 3:40
 Io sono qua - 3:03
 E così sia - 3:09

References

2008 albums
Punkreas albums